Stadl-Predlitz is a municipality since 2015 in the Murau District of Styria, Austria.

It was created as part of the Styria municipal structural reform,
at the end of 2014, by merging the former towns Stadl an der Mur and Predlitz-Turrach.

Geography

Municipality arrangement 
The municipality territory includes the following seven sections (populations as of January 2015):
 Einach (235)
 Paal (127)
 Predlitz (380)
 Sonnberg (81)
 Stadl an der Mur (448)
 Steindorf (297)
 Turrach (150)

The municipality consists of three Katastralgemeinden (areas 2015):
 Einach
 Predlitz
 Stadl

Neighboring municipalities 
The municipality borders on one Styrian, three Salzburger, and six Kärntner municipalities (TA = Tamsweg District, SV = Sankt Veit an der Glan District, FE = Feldkirchen District, SP = Spittal an der Drau District).

Incorporations 
 In 1969 the independent municipalities Einach and Predlitz were joined into municipality Predlitz-Turrach.
 In 2015 the municipalities Stadl an der Mur and Predlitz-Turrach were joined into new municipality Stadl-Predlitz.

Demographics

Culture and sights 

 Saints Primus and Felician church in Predlitz. A Romanesque church that was expanded to the west in 1707/1709 and whose choir was built around 1452.

Politics

Municipal council 
The prior elections brought the following results:

The ÖVP held with Johannes Rauter as mayor.

Wappen 

The granting of the town crest came into effect on 10 January 2016.
The blazon (crest description) reads:
 "In a diagonal-split shield, at lower left on silver a black wheeled Bessemerburner with three red flames, at upper right on green a silver capped window Salzstadl with a blue Schwert."

Notable people 
 Erich Moser (born 1948), former mayor of Stadl an der Mur and Bundesrat

References

External links 

Cities and towns in Murau District